Spaulding is a surname. Notable people with the surname include:

Charles Clinton Spaulding (1874–1952) prominent African-American business owner in Durham, North Carolina
Douglas Spaulding (born 1933), American Shakespeare scholar
Elbridge G. Spaulding (1809–1897), American politician – Buffalo, New York
Elna Spaulding (1909–2007), American civic leader
Hiland J. Spaulding (1841–1927), Wisconsin state legislator
Huntley Nowel Spaulding (1869–1955) 
Joseph Spaulding, American farmer and legislator
Kenneth Spaulding, American lawyer and legislator
Leila Clement Spaulding (1878–1973), American classicist and archaeologist
Myron Spaulding (1905–2000), American yacht designer, sailboat racer and concert violinist
Norman Spaulding, law professor
Oliver L. Spaulding (1833–1922), U.S. Representative from Michigan
Oliver Lyman Spaulding (1875–1947, U.S. Army brigadier general
Philip F. Spaulding (1912–2005), American naval architect
Robert Spaulding, English scholar
Rolland H. Spaulding (1873–1942), Governor of New Hampshire
William H. Spaulding, former college football coach
William J. Spaulding, Sr. (1923–1997), American singer and songwriter

Fictional characters 
Alan Spaulding, a character from the American television soap opera Guiding Light
Alexandra Spaulding, a character from Guiding Light
Alan-Michael Spaulding, a character from Guiding Light
Phillip Spaulding, a character from Guiding Light
Lizzie Spaulding, a character from Guiding Light
Captain Spaulding, a character appearing in films by Rob Zombie
Captain Spaulding (Animal Crackers), a character portrayed by Groucho Marx
Douglas Spaulding, a character from the Ray Bradbury novel Dandelion Wine
 Captain Calvin Spalding, a character played by Loudon Wainwright III in the television series M*A*S*H
Spaulding Smails, grandson of Ted Knight's character in the 1980 film Caddyshack
Spalding, a character from The Adventures of Tintin

See also
Spalding (surname)

English-language surnames
Lists of people by surname